Hambling is a surname. Notable people with the surname include:

Arthur Hambling (1888–1952), English actor
Gerry Hambling (1926–2013), English film editor
Maggi Hambling (born 1945), English painter and sculptor
Robert Hambling, Australian film editor and music video director

See also 

 Hambling baronets